Megacephala megacephala, common name big-headed tiger beetle, is a species of tiger beetle in the subfamily Cicindelinae that was described by Olivier in 1790.

Distribution
This species can be found in savanna-type habitats of Africa.

References

megacephala
Beetles described in 1790